Atoconeura is a genus of dragonflies in the family Libellulidae.

These dragonflies are generally about 28 to 39 millimeters long and are shiny black with yellow markings. They are native to Africa, where they are usually found along fast-flowing rivers in forested habitat at some elevation. The genus has likely been isolated in higher-altitude habitat, and most of the species are limited to highlands.

Species include:
Atoconeura aethiopica 
Atoconeura biordinata 
Atoconeura eudoxia 
Atoconeura kenya 
Atoconeura luxata  – western highlander
Atoconeura pseudeudoxia

References

Libellulidae
Insects of Africa
Anisoptera genera
Taxa named by Ferdinand Karsch
Taxonomy articles created by Polbot